Padrino or El Padrino (Spanish for "the Godfather")  or Il Padrino (Italian for "the Godfather") or variation, may refer to:

Crime
A synonym for crime boss
Capo dei capi, Italian for "boss of all bosses"

People
 Vladimir Padrino López (born 1963) Venezuelan politician

Nickname or alias
 José Miguel Battle Sr. (1929–2007), founder of the Corporation or Cuban Mafia
 Adolfo Constanzo (1962-1989); serial killer, drug trafficker, and cult leader
 Pablo Escobar (1949–1993), founder of the Medellin Cartel
 Miguel Ángel Félix Gallardo (born 1946), founder of the Guadalajara Cartel 
 Juan Nepomuceno Guerra (1915–2001), founder of the Gulf Cartel

Entertainment
 Il Padrino (Italian for "the Godfather"), the title of the Godfather in the Italian language sequences for the film franchise The Godfather
 El Padrino (film), a 2004 film
 Ang Padrino, 1984 Philippine film
 Los Padrinos, 1973 Argentinian film
 "Padrino", a 1997 song by Smash Mouth from the album Fush Yu Mang

Other uses
 Padrino system, the system of patronage in the Philippines
 Padrino (web framework), a web application framework
 Los Padrinos Juvenile Hall, Downey, California, USA; a former juvenile detention facility of the Los Angeles County Probation Department

See also

 Godfather (disambiguation)
 
 
 
 

Lists of people by nickname
Nicknames in crime